Rezaabad (also Romanized as Reẕāābād; also known as Cham Kāv, Chenār Bāshī, and Chenār Bāshī-ye Reẕāābād) is a village in Alishervan Rural District, in the Sivan District of Ilam County, Ilam Province, Iran. At the 2006 census, its population was 31, in 7 families. The village is populated by Kurds.

References 

Populated places in Ilam County
Kurdish settlements in Ilam Province